This article contains a list of Afrikaans-language radio stations.

Public
 RSG (Radio Sonder Grense) - South Africa
  NBC Namibian Broadcasting Corporation, one Afrikaans-language station
  Skatkis Stereo, online web radio, Afrikaans sprekende omroepers

Commercial South African Stations
 Jacaranda 94.2
 OFM 
 Overvaal Stereo

Community South African Radio Stations
 East Radio Stereo - Oos-Rand Stereo in Afrikaans
 Radio Helderberg
 Radio Kragbron
 Radio Laeveld
 Radio Namakwaland
 Radio Orania
 Radio Panorama
 Radio Pretoria
 Radio Rosestad 100.6 FM
 Radio Tygerberg
 Boervolk Radio
 Radio Suid Afrika
 Groot FM
 BokRadio
 Bosveld Stereo
 Luister FM
 Radio Overberg 101.8fm

Student Radio Stations 
 Tuks FM - University of Pretoria
 MFM 92.6 - University of Stellenbosch
 PUK FM - Potchefstroom NWU campus
 Kovsies FM - University of the Free State

Commercial Namibian Stations 
 Radio Kosmos
 Radio Kudu

Internet Radio Stations

Community Namibian Stations 
 Kanaal 7 / Channel 7

See also 
List of Radio Stations (South Africa)
List of Radio Stations (Africa)